Surprise Records was a record label subsidiary of Island Records.

See also
 List of record labels

Defunct record labels of the United States